Spotlight PA is a nonprofit, investigative reporting partnership of Pennsylvania news organization based in Harrisburg, Pennsylvania, and founded in 2019. It bills itself as "an independent, nonpartisan and statewide newsroom dedicated to producing investigative journalism about Pennsylvania government ..." Spotlight PA's founding partners were The Philadelphia Inquirer, Pittsburgh Post-Gazette, and PennLive/The Patriot-News. In 2020, WITF Public Media in Harrisburg joined the collaborative, folding its existing PA Post project into Spotlight PA.

Spotlight PA was built on the foundation of a 2009 collaboration between the Post-Gazette and the Inquirer. As of November 2020, fifty-three Pennsylvania newsrooms were affiliated with Spotlight PA.

References

Investigative journalism
Non-profit organizations based in Pennsylvania
Organizations established in 2019
American journalism organizations
2019 establishments in Pennsylvania
Organizations based in Harrisburg, Pennsylvania
Harrisburg, Pennsylvania